A first-generation programming language (1GL) is a machine-level programming language.

A first generation (programming) language (1GL) is a grouping of programming languages that are machine level languages used to program first-generation computers. Originally, no translator was used to compile or assemble the first-generation language. The first-generation programming instructions were entered through the front panel switches of the computer system.

The instructions in 1GL are made of binary numbers, represented by 1s and 0s. This makes the language suitable for the understanding of the machine but far more difficult to interpret and learn by the human programmer.

The main advantage of programming in 1GL is that the code can run very fast and very efficiently, precisely because the instructions are executed directly by the central processing unit (CPU). One of the main disadvantages of programming in a low level language is that when an error occurs, the code is not as easy to fix.

First generation languages are very much adapted to a specific computer and CPU, and code portability is therefore significantly reduced in comparison to higher level languages.

Modern day programmers still occasionally use machine level code, especially when programming lower level functions of the system, such as drivers, interfaces with firmware and hardware devices. Modern tools such as native-code compilers are used to produce machine level from a higher-level language.

References

General
1. Nwankwogu S.E (2016). Programming Languages and their history.

Programming language classification